Simon Owen (born 10 December 1950) is a professional golfer from New Zealand.

Early life 
Owen was born in Wanganui.

Professional career 
He turned professional in 1971 and has won several tournaments in Australasia. He played on the European Tour from the mid-1970s to the mid-1980s, winning the 1974 German Open and the 1976 Double Diamond Individual Championship. His best finish on the European Tour Order of Merit was eleventh in 1974. His best finish in a major was at the 1978 British Open, when he finished tied for second behind Jack Nicklaus. Earlier in the year he finished in second place at the Malaysian Dunlop Masters.

Since 2001 Owen has played senior professional golf, and he has won two tournaments on the European Seniors Tour. He has also won the New Zealand PGA Seniors Championship on two occasions.

Owen's brother Craig is also a professional golfer and played for New Zealand in the World Cup in 1979 and 1980.

Professional wins (15)

European Tour wins (2)

European Tour playoff record (1–0)

PGA Tour of Australasia wins (3)

Other Australasian wins (3)
1984 Hawkes Bay 72 Hole Classic (New Zealand)
1989 Hawkes Bay 72 Hole Classic (New Zealand)
1990 City of Auckland 72 Hole Classic

Other wins (2)
1972 Air New Zealand Fiji Open
1991 Tahiti Open, Cable & Wireless - Pacific Harbour Open (Fiji)

European Senior Tour wins (2)

European Senior Tour playoff record (2–0)

Other senior wins (3)
2001 New Zealand PGA Seniors Championship
2003 New Zealand PGA Seniors Championship
2014 Australian PGA Seniors Championship

Results in major championships

Note: Owen only played in the Masters Tournament and The Open Championship.

CUT = missed the half-way cut (3rd round cut in 1977 and 1982 Open Championships)
"T" indicates a tie for a place

Team appearances
Dunhill Cup (representing New Zealand): 1989, 1990
World Cup (representing New Zealand): 1973, 1976, 1989

References

External links

New Zealand male golfers
PGA Tour of Australasia golfers
European Tour golfers
European Senior Tour golfers
Sportspeople from Whanganui
1950 births
Living people